GRITS's Art of Transformation is a remix record from the Grammy Nominated CD, The Art of Translation.

Track listing
"Here we go" (Liquid Beats remix)
"Ooh, Ahh (Liquid Beats remix) (featuring TobyMac)
"Runnin'" (DJ Form remix) (featuring V3)
"Tennessee Bwoys (Pettidee remix)
"Be mine" (Liquid Beats remix)
"Seriously" (DJ Form remix)
"Believe" (DJ Form remix)
"Get it" (DJ Form remix)
"Make Room" (Pettidee remix)
"Sunny Days" (Liquid Beats remix)
"Lovechild" (Liquid Beats remix)
"Jay Mumbles Mega Mix" (featuring IZ)

GRITS albums
2004 remix albums
Gotee Records remix albums